Mixed Emotions is the third album by David Lynn Jones. It was released May 5, 1992 by Liberty Records.

Critical reception

Brian Mansfield writes for AllMusic, "In his heart he's still country, but he revs the tempos, cranks the guitars, and lays on the horns as he takes off screaming into the Arkansas Delta." AllMusic rated the album 4½ out of a possible 5 stars.

Michael Franklin of Outlaw Magazine writes in an interview with David Lynn Jones, "Jones released Mixed Emotions (on Liberty Records) in 1992, containing exactly zero hits and no charting singles.  It did, however, have a couple of songs about religious wars, specifically in the Middle East ("The Land Of Ala", "Judgement Day").  In the boot-scootin’ boogie lights of 1992 Nashville, the expansive Mixed Emotions was a non-starter.  Criminally ignored, it was an uncut diamond swept away by a tide of John Deere Green."

Track listing

Musicians
David Lynn Jones – vocals, guitars, percussion
The Sons of Thunder
R. P. Harrell – keyboards
Jerry Bone – bass
Rick Richards – drums
Robby Springfield – guitars, pedal steel
Richie Albright – percussion
Additional musicians
Bob Henderson – saxophones
Philip Moore – trombone
Tim Crouch – mandolin
Terry McMillan – harp, percussion
Background vocals – R. P. Harrell, Bob Henderson, Robby Springfield, David Lynn Jones, Debbie Harrell, Jimmie Lou Springfield, Michel Stone

Production
Joe Scaife – Recording Engineer, Mix Engineer
R. P. Harrell – Recording Engineer, Mix Engineer
Greg Parker – Assistant Mix Engineer
Milan Bogdan – Digital Editing

Track information and credits adapted from the album's liner notes.

References

1992 albums
David Lynn Jones albums
Liberty Records albums